Junes Barny (born 4 November 1989) is a Swedish footballer who plays as a midfielder for Jönköpings Södra. He is of Moroccan descent.

Career
On 13 July 2018, Barny signed a short-term deal with Hammarby IF in Allsvenskan. He scored his first goal for the club on 27 August, in a 3–2 away win against Dalkurd FF.

On 31 January 2019, Barny signed a two-year contract with IFK Göteborg, with an option for a further year. In June 2019, Barny he left the club. In August 2020, Barny moved to Varbergs BoIS, where he signed a six-month contract. In January 2021, Barny signed with Cypriot First Division club Enosis Neon Paralimni. On 10 August 2021, Barny signed with Jönköpings Södra on a free transfer, penning a contract until December 2023.

Personal life 
Barny is a dual national; he holds a Swedish EU passport as well as a Moroccan passport.

References

External links

1989 births
Living people
Swedish people of Moroccan descent
Association football forwards
Högaborgs BK players
Ängelholms FF players
Halmstads BK players
GAIS players
Difaâ Hassani El Jadidi players
Hammarby Fotboll players
IFK Göteborg players
Allsvenskan players
Superettan players
Swedish footballers
Expatriate footballers in Morocco
Varbergs BoIS players
Enosis Neon Paralimni FC players
Jönköpings Södra IF players
Expatriate footballers in Cyprus
Swedish expatriate sportspeople in Cyprus
Swedish expatriate footballers
Cypriot First Division players
Sportspeople from Helsingborg